Dr. J. A. Savage House, also known as Albion Academy, was a historic home located at 124 East College Street in Franklinton, Franklin County, North Carolina.  It was built about 1880, and enlarged to its present size about 1895.  It was a two-story, frame house with a cross-gable roof, sheathed with plain weatherboards, and rests on a brick and stone pier foundation.  It had a one-story rear kitchen ell.  It was originally built as a classroom and/or dormitory, and enlarged by Dr. John A. Savage for use as his private residence.  The building housed Albion Academy (1880-1933), a school for African-American elementary and high school students founded by the Presbyterian Board of Missions for Freedmen.

It was listed on the National Register of Historic Places in 1980.  Due to the continued deterioration of the building, it was demolished in 1997. The lot is currently vacant.

References

African-American history of North Carolina
Houses on the National Register of Historic Places in North Carolina
Houses completed in 1895
Houses in Franklin County, North Carolina
National Register of Historic Places in Franklin County, North Carolina
Demolished buildings and structures in North Carolina
Buildings and structures demolished in 1997